Wapella is a town of 354 located northwest of Moosomin on the Trans-Canada Highway.

Demographics 

Notable people
 Brett Clark - professional hockey player in NHL. He played in the Canadian National team program, as well as for the Montreal Canadiens, Atlanta Thrashers, Colorado Avalanche, Tampa Bay Lightning and Minnesota Wild franchises.
 Bud Holloway, a professional hockey player. He currently plays (2015/2016 season) for the St. John's IceCaps in the AHL. He has previously played for SC Bern in the National League A, it is the top tier of the Swiss hockey league system, for the Skellefteå AIK in the SHL and for the Manchester Monarchs, the AHL affiliate of the Los Angeles Kings.
 Cyril Edel Leonoff is the grandson of Edel Brotman, a homesteader and rabbi of the Wapella, Saskatchewan, farm colony, 1889–1906.

Climate

See also 

 List of communities in Saskatchewan
List of place names in Canada of Indigenous origin
 List of towns in Saskatchewan

Footnotes

Towns in Saskatchewan
Martin No. 122, Saskatchewan
Division No. 5, Saskatchewan